A white power symbol is an insignia, sign or gesture used to espouse a viewpoint that people of European descent are superior to other people. White power symbols may be found in:

 Nazi symbolism
 Fascist symbolism
 List of symbols designated by the Anti-Defamation League as hate symbols